Jacob Hahn was a cigar maker from Milwaukee, Wisconsin who served one term as a Socialist member of the Wisconsin State Assembly.

Hahn was born in Wittlich, Germany on October 10, 1879. He came to Milwaukee in 1883, attended the public schools, learned the craft of cigarmaking, and had been a trade union member of the Cigar Maker's Union for the past thirteen years when elected. Hahn was married to Martha Strasse. He died March 24, 1970 in Milwaukee.

Legislature 
In 1910, Hahn was elected to the Fifth Milwaukee County Assembly seat (5th and 12th Wards of the City of Milwaukee), unseating incumbent Democrat Michael Kalaher with 1,581 votes to 982 for Kalaher and 779 for Republican Albert T. Jenkins. He was assigned to the standing committees on excises and fees, and on engrossed bills.

By 1912, a redistricting had split Hahn's district into two new districts matching the numbers of the wards which made them up. The new Fifth elected Democrat Charles Stemper, and the new Twelfth elected Hahn's fellow Socialist and union activist William L. Smith. Hahn returned to the cigar trade.

References 

1879 births
1970 deaths
Cigar makers
German emigrants to the United States
Members of the Wisconsin State Assembly
Politicians from Milwaukee
People from Wittlich
Socialist Party of America politicians from Wisconsin
Businesspeople from Wisconsin
People from the Rhine Province